Down is one of the six counties comprising Northern Ireland.

County Down was represented in the Northern Ireland House of Commons 1921–1973. This article deals with the Down County constituencies. For the County Down Borough constituencies in the City of Belfast, see Belfast (Northern Ireland Parliament constituencies). See also the List of Northern Ireland Parliament constituencies 1921-1973.

Boundaries
1921-1929: The part of County Down not included in the Belfast seats was an eight-member constituency, electing MPs using the single transferable vote method of proportional representation. There was a two-member UK Parliament constituency of Down, 1922–1950, with the same boundaries.

1929-1969: The area was divided into eight single member divisions, electing MPs using the first past the post electoral system. From north to south the divisions were:-
 North.
 Ards.
 Mid.
 Iveagh.
 East.
 West.
 Mourne.
 South.

1969-1973: Under the Electoral Law Act (Northern Ireland) 1968, the four member Queen's University of Belfast constituency was abolished in 1969. Two of its seats were re-allocated to Down. The new divisions of Bangor and Lagan Valley affected the boundaries of the existing Mid and North seats.

Summary of Representation of Constituencies
Key to Parties: N Nationalist, Rep Republican, SF Sinn Féin, U Ulster Unionist

 1921-1925 U 6, N 1, SF 1 (1st Parliament)
 1925-1929 U 6, N 1, Rep 1 (2nd Parliament)

Notes:-

Members of Parliament
In this list the multi member constituency (1921–29) is referred to as DOWN.

Dáil Éireann
In 1921 Sinn Féin decided to use the UK authorised elections for the Northern Ireland House of Commons and the House of Commons of Southern Ireland as a poll for the Irish Republic's Second Dáil. This area, in republican theory, was the eight-member Dáil constituency of Down.

Sources
 Northern Ireland Parliamentary Election Results 1921-1972, compiled and edited by Sydney Elliott (Political Reference Publications 1973)
For the exact definition of constituency boundaries see http://www.election.demon.co.uk/stormont/boundaries.html

Constituencies of the Northern Ireland Parliament
Historic constituencies in County Down